Samuel Gidi (born 15 April 2004) is a Ghanaian professional footballer who currently plays for Žilina in the Fortuna Liga as a defensive midfielder.

Club career

MŠK Žilina
Gidi made his Fortuna Liga debut for Žilina against AS Trenčín on 16 July 2022.

References

External links
 MŠK Žilina official club profile 
 
 Futbalnet profile 
 

2004 births
Living people
Ghanaian footballers
Ghanaian expatriate footballers
Association football midfielders
MŠK Žilina players
Slovak Super Liga players
Expatriate footballers in Slovakia
Ghanaian expatriate sportspeople in Slovakia
MŠK Žilina Africa players